Hamburg GAA is a GAA club in Hamburg, Germany. The club runs Gaelic football sessions at Stadtpark and hurling/camogie at Hochschulsport Hamburg facilities. The club competes in Gaelic Games Europe competitions.

History
The club was founded in summer 2015. The club crest is made up of Hamburg’s colours (red and blue) and shows a castle with three towers and two Marian stars, which are said to symbolise the fact that Hamburg used to be an archbishopric.

Honours
 On Saturday 11 March 2017 the chairman of Hamburg GAA Stephen O'Rourke presented a signed Hamburg GAA jersey to the EPIC The Irish Emigration Museum. The jersey is intended to be displayed in the museum's Gaelic Games Gallery, which acknowledges the work done by GAA clubs around the globe.
 Hosted the 2nd round of the European Hurling Championship 2017 in Hamburg
 German Camogie and Hurling champions 2018 and 2019

See also
 Gaelic Games Europe
 List of Gaelic games clubs outside Ireland
 Hurling
 Camogie
 Gaelic football

References

External links
 Official website

2015 establishments in Germany
Gaelic Athletic Association clubs established in 2015
Hamburg
Hamburg
Sport in Hamburg
Sports teams in Germany